Mayucha was a town that existed in what is now Oconee County, South Carolina, United States from 1850 to the early 1900s.

Ghost towns in South Carolina
Geography of Oconee County, South Carolina